Larry Porter (born April 28, 1972) is an American college football coach. He currently serves as special teams coordinator and running backs coach and at the University of North Carolina at Chapel Hill. Porter is a former head coach of the Memphis Tigers football team. He was named to the position on November 29, 2009 replacing Tommy West. A former running back for the school when it was known as Memphis State University, Porter was formerly an assistant head coach, chief recruiter, and running backs coach at Louisiana State University under Les Miles. On November 27, 2011, Porter was fired after completing a 2–10 season with only having won three games during his two-year tenure.

Playing career
Porter lettered four years (1990–93) at Memphis, serving as co-captain of the 1993 Tiger squad. He closed out his career with 2,194 yards and 20 rushing touchdowns, ranking seventh in school history in yardage and tied for fifth in touchdowns.

As a freshman in 1990, Porter rushed for 206 yards against Arkansas State University, the highest single-game total for a freshman in school history. In his first game, he replaced injured starting tailback Marvin Cox and raced 53 yards for a touchdown against Arkansas State on his first college carry. Porter had a total of six 100-yard games during his career, a figure that ranks tied for fifth in Memphis history. Porter graduated in 1996 with a bachelor's degree in education.

Coaching career
Porter began his coaching career at Wooddale High School in Memphis, Tennessee, serving as head track and field coach, while assisting with the running backs and secondary on the football squad. After two years at Wooddale, Porter moved to the collegiate ranks, coaching the running backs at Tennessee-Martin in 1998.

Porter then spent three years at Arkansas State, where he coached Jonathan Adams to back-to-back 1,000-yard seasons. Adams rushed for 1,004 yards and six touchdowns in 2000 and followed that with another 1,004 yards and five scores in 2001. Under Porter's tutelage, Adams capped his career as the second-leading rusher in Arkansas State history.

In 2002, Porter was hired by Oklahoma State coach Les Miles as Running Backs coach. At OSU, Porter's stable of running backs continued the tradition of "Tailback U.", as he coached 1,000-yard rushers for three straight seasons. In 2004, Vernand Morency earned second-team All-Big 12 honors after rushing for 1,474 yards, which ranked eighth in the nation, and 12 touchdowns. Morency was a third round pick of the Houston Texans in 2005.

A year earlier, Tatum Bell earned first-team All-Big 12 honors with 1,286 yards and 16 touchdowns. Bell and Morency combined for 2,204 yards and 24 touchdowns for the Cowboys in 2003. Bell then went on to become a second round draft pick by the Denver Broncos in the 2004 NFL Draft. In his first season at OSU, Porter guided Bell to a 1,096-yard, 11-touchdown season for 8–5 Oklahoma State.

In 2005, Porter joined coach Miles at LSU. He has coached LSU running backs while also holding two key roles on staff – assistant head coach and chief recruiter. Porter was elevated to the position of assistant head coach during the spring of 2006. He was twice (2007 and 2009) named as the National Recruiter of the Year by Rivals.com making him one of the top all-around assistant coaches in college football.

In three of the last four seasons (2006–09 included), the LSU rushing unit has averaged over 165 yards a game, including a high of 214 yards per game in 2007. That squad closed out the season ranked 11th nationally in rushing. From 2005–08, the Tigers totaled 108 rushing touchdowns, including 35 in 2007.

As LSU's running backs coach, Porter has helped developed some of the finest players at that position in LSU's history. From 2005–08, LSU produced a 1,000-yard rusher twice – Jacob Hester 1,103 yards in 2007 and Charles Scott 1,174 yards in 2008 – as well as having two players (Hester and Joseph Addai) selected in the NFL Draft.

In 2008, LSU again had one of the top running games in the SEC as the Tigers rushed for 166.8 yards per game with Scott getting the bulk of the carries (1,174 yards on 217 attempts). Scott, who earned first-team All-SEC in 2008, and Keiland Williams (417 yards, 2 touchdowns on 83 attempts) gave the Tigers one of the top 1–2 rushing punches in the league last year.

Porter and the Tigers had a running back-by-committee approach during the national championship season in 2007 with Hester leading all rushers with a career-best 1,103 yards and 11 touchdowns. Hester, who was a second-team All-SEC selection, had four 100-yard rushing games, including a 120-yard effort against Tennessee in the SEC Championship Game. Williams was second on the squad with 478 yards and six scores, while Trindon Holliday was third with 364 yards and two touchdowns.

As a unit, LSU rushed for 214.1 yards per game and 35 touchdowns. The 214.1 yards per game and 35 rushing touchdowns both ranked second in the SEC. Another impressive feat for the Tiger running backs was the fact that they combined for 432 carries in 2007 with just one lost fumble, which came against Tennessee in the SEC title game.

Following the 2007 season, Hester was picked in the third round of the 2008 NFL Draft by the San Diego Chargers. Hester became the fourth running back coached by Porter that has been selected among the first three rounds of the NFL Draft since 2004.

In 2006, Porter juggled running backs as the Tigers started four players, including two true freshmen, at tailback. In 13 games, the Tigers had five running backs lead the team in rushing. Hester led the Tigers in rushing with 440 yards and six scores. Hester added another 269 yards and three touchdowns on 35 receptions, which ranked as the third-highest total for a running back in school history.

A pair of true freshmen in Scott and Williams also burst onto the scene during the 2006 season, giving the Tigers a glimpse of the future as they combined for 713 yards and 10 touchdowns. Williams capped his first season with the Tigers in a big way, rushing for 107 yards and a pair of scores in LSU's 41–14 win over Notre Dame in the Sugar Bowl.

As a unit, the Tigers ranked second in the SEC in rushing in 2006 with 165.8 yards per game. The Tigers also had 25 rushing touchdowns, a figure that ranked No. 2 in the league.

In his first year with the team in 2005, Porter made an immediate impact on LSU's running game as the Tigers, despite losing perhaps the top runner in the SEC in Alley Broussard to a knee injury in mid-August, still managed to rush for 1,951 yards and 21 touchdowns. LSU's rushing offense ranked fourth in the SEC, while the 21 rushing touchdowns was the second-highest total in the league.

Addai had his best year in a Tiger uniform, rushing for 911 yards and nine touchdowns; while Justin Vincent added 488 yards and five scores. Addai had five 100-yard rushing games, capped by a 130-yard, one-touchdown performance in LSU's 40–3 win over Miami in the Peach Bowl. He went on to become a first round draft pick of the Indianapolis Colts in the 2006 NFL Draft, becoming the first LSU running back taken in the first round of the NFL Draft since Harvey Williams was the 21st overall pick by the Chiefs in 1991. Addai was a finalist for NFL Rookie of the Year in 2006 and played a key role in the Colts' Super Bowl victory over the Chicago Bears.

Porter took over the head coaching position at his alma mater, the University of Memphis, for the 2010 season. He was fired after the 2011 season for winning only three games over two seasons and nearly destroying the entire program with his ineptitude.

On February 10, it was announced that Porter would take the position of running backs coach at Arizona State University. The move comes after former coach Chris Thomsen left to coach the offensive line at Texas Tech University.

On January 1, 2013, Porter accepted the running backs coaching position at the University of Texas at Austin. On February 11, 2014, Porter was announced as the running backs coach at the University of North Carolina at Chapel Hill. On February 11, 2017, Porter was announced as tight ends and H-back coach and recruiting coordinator at Auburn University.

On January 29, 2021, Porter was announced as running backs coach at the University of North Carolina, returning for a second stint in Chapel Hill and reuniting with head coach Mack Brown, whom he had worked for at Texas for the 2013 season. Porter replaced Robert Gillespie, who left for Alabama. He was also given the title of assistant special teams coordinator, working with coordinator Jovan Dewitt. Following Dewitt's departure after the conclusion of the 2021 season, Porter was named the Tar Heels' special teams coordinator in addition to his responsibilities as running backs coach.

Personal
Porter and his wife Sharmane have three children, Brandon, Omari and Olivia.

Head coaching record

References

External links
 North Carolina profile

1972 births
Living people
American football running backs
Arizona State Sun Devils football coaches
Arkansas State Red Wolves football coaches
LSU Tigers football coaches
Memphis Tigers football coaches
Memphis Tigers football players
North Carolina Tar Heels football coaches
Oklahoma State Cowboys football coaches
UT Martin Skyhawks football coaches
Texas Longhorns football coaches
Coaches of American football from Mississippi
Players of American football from Jackson, Mississippi
African-American coaches of American football
African-American players of American football
20th-century African-American sportspeople
21st-century African-American sportspeople